NGC 3705 is a barred spiral galaxy in the constellation Leo. It was discovered by William Herschel on Jan 18, 1784. It is a member of the Leo II Groups, a series of galaxies and galaxy clusters strung out from the right edge of the Virgo Supercluster.

See also
 List of NGC objects (3001–4000)

Gallery

References

External links
 

Barred spiral galaxies
Leo (constellation)
3705
Astronomical objects discovered in 1784
Discoveries by William Herschel
035440